Advanced Robotics for Manufacturing (ARM), also known as ARM Institute, is a consortium created in 2017 through a Department of Defense grant won by Carnegie Mellon University. ARM is structured as a public-private partnership and the Manufacturing USA Institutes, a network of 16 institutes dedicated to advancing technologies used in manufacturing. ARM was the 14th institute created and focuses on funding innovations in robotics and workforce development.

History 
ARM was founded in January 2017 as the 14th Manufacturing USA Institute with $80M in federal funding. A proposal team led by Carnegie Mellon University won the grant to create ARM, though more than 200 partners pledged support for the institute during the proposal phase.

Structure 
Like the other Manufacturing USA institutes, ARM operates as a membership-based consortium with more than 200 national members spanning industry, academia, and government. ARM periodically releases separate technology and workforce development project calls. Members then form teams to bid for funding. The project calls center on areas where robotics and/or better workforce development initiatives could solve problems in the national manufacturing sector

Headquarters 
ARM is headquartered in the Hazelwood (Pittsburgh), Pennsylvania, co-location with Carnegie Mellon University's Manufacturing Futures Initiative at Mill 19.

ARM marked the opening of its headquarters on 4 September 2019. ARM and Carnegie Mellon were the first two tenants on the site, which is on one of the three planned buildings, on a 90,000 square-foot facility, with the site having remained empty for 15 years.

In October 2022, ARM announced the opening of its Florida office in the Tampa Bay Innovation Center in St. Petersburg.

Notable Events and Accolades 

 In January 2022, United States President Joe Biden visited the location to deliver a speech on infrastructure and job creation in support of his Build Back Better Plan. 
 In September 2022, ARM was a recipient of a $14.2 million grant through the federal Build Back Better (BBB) Regional Challenge awarded by the U.S. Economic Development Administration. 
 In September 2022, The ARM institute and their video partner Skinny Tie Media were awarded two bronze Telly Awards for their animated video for roboticscareers.com.

References

External links
ARM Institute official website
RoboticsCareer.org - launched in 2021 to connect education seekers, providers, and employers with vetted training for manufacturing careers in robotics.

Consortia in the United States
College and university associations and consortia in the United States
2017 establishments in the United States
Organizations established in 2017